Robert Edwards Hunter is an American government employee and foreign policy expert who served as United States ambassador to NATO during the Clinton administration.

Early life and education 
Hunter was born in Cambridge, Massachusetts in 1940. He earned a B.A. from Wesleyan University, graduating in 1962 with honors and Phi Beta Kappa. Hunter earned a Doctor of Philosophy in international relations from the London School of Economics in 1969 as a Fulbright Scholar.

Career 
During the Clinton administration, Hunter was United States Ambassador to NATO (1993–1998), where he was principal architect and negotiator of the post-Cold War "new NATO" and of the NATO airstrike decisions that ended the Bosnian War.

Throughout the administration of President Jimmy Carter, Hunter was the senior-most official on West European Affairs (1977–1979) and then Middle East Affairs (1979–1981) on the National Security Council staff. He was the first foreign policy advisor to Senator Edward M. Kennedy (1973–1977). He served on the White House staff, focusing on education, under President Lyndon B. Johnson (1964–1965). He was an administrative management intern at the U.S. Navy's Polaris Project, both in Washington and the British Admiralty.

He was President of the Atlantic Treaty Association, the umbrella organization for NATO's 41 Atlantic Councils, headquartered in Brussels, from 2003 to 2008. Hunter was Chairman of the Council for a Community of Democracies for 2001 to 2014. He was Senior Fellow at the Overseas Development Institute (1970–1973); Lead Consultant to the National Bipartisan Commission on Central America ("Kissinger Commission") from 1983 to 1984; Advisor on Lebanon to the Speaker of the House (1983); and served on the Secretary of Defense's Defense Policy Board from 1998 to 2001. He is a member of the Executive Committee of the Board of the American Academy of Diplomacy, a former member of the Board of the Atlantic Council of the United States, and a member of the Board of the European Institute. He was a member of the Academic Advisory Board of the NATO Defense College in Rome, from 2010 to 2013. He was Chairman of the Charlemagne District of the Transatlantic Council of the Boy Scouts of America from 1994 to 1997, and is a Distinguished Eagle Scout. He was an Associate at the Belfer Center for Science and International Affairs from 1998 to 2010.

Hunter has authored more than 1000 publications, written for Foreign Policy, Foreign Affairs, The Washington Quarterly, and many other journals, as well as chapters in books and op-ed articles in The Los Angeles Times, The New York Times, and The Washington Post (more than 400 articles from 1981 to 1993). His books include Security in Europe, Indiana University Press, 1972; Presidential Control of Foreign Policy: Management or Mishap, Center for Strategic and International Studies, 1982; The European Security and Defense Policy: NATO's Companion or Competitor?, RAND, 2002; Building a Successful Palestinian State: Security (with Seth Jones), RAND, 2006; and Building Security in the Persian Gulf, RAND, 2010. His oral history, Education Never Ends, was published by the Association for Diplomatic Studies and Training in 2011. In 2021 he published academic article The Strategic Importance of the Atlantic Alliance in The Challenge to NATO: Global Security and the Atlantic Alliance. He has given thousands of speeches and radio and television appearances in more than 20 countries. He has taught at the London School of Economics, George Washington University, Georgetown University, the Paul H. Nitze School of Advanced International Studies, and Washington College, where he was Louis L. Goldstein Chair in Public Policy in 1989. He has been decorated by eight foreign countries and has twice been decorated with the Department of Defense Medal for Distinguished Public Service, the Pentagon's highest civilian decoration.

Hunter has played a national policy role in eight U.S. presidential election campaigns and written speeches and articles for presidential candidates, three U.S. Presidents four Vice Presidents, Secretaries of State and Defense, Senators, Representatives and other political figures.

Until July 2018, Hunter was a Senior Fellow at the Center for Transatlantic Relations at the Paul H. Nitze School of Advanced International Studies. He was a member of the Secretary of State's International Security Advisory Board from 2011 to 2017 (when it was dissolved). He was Director of the Center for Transatlantic Security Studies at the National Defense University from 2010 to 2012, and Senior Advisor at the RAND Corporation from 1998 to 2010.

Personal life 
He is married to Shireen Hunter (née Tahmasseb).

References

External links

Permanent Representatives of the United States to NATO
1940 births
Living people
Wesleyan University alumni
Place of birth missing (living people)
Recipients of the Order of the Cross of Terra Mariana, 3rd Class